Mariote Ker (floruit 1529) was a Scottish burgess. 

Kerr was appointed to the position of burgess of Dundee on the recommendation of King James V of Scotland on 12 November 1529. She was the first of her sex to have this position in Scotland, and the only one in Dundee until 360 years later.

References 

Scottish merchants
15th-century Scottish women
16th-century Scottish women
16th-century Scottish businesspeople
16th-century businesswomen